Víctor Miguel Coto Ortega (born September 29, 1990 in Limón, Costa Rica) is a Costa Rican footballer. He is the first Costa Rican to have ever played in the S.League.

Club career

Leaving Costa Rica aged 15 to start his youth career, Coto lived in italy, during his time at Cisco Roma.

He has played in Europe and Asia had a spell at Argentine second division outfit Gimnasia Jujuy who released him in December 2011.

Coto played the 2014 Verano for Costa Rican primera division side UCR.

Penning a one-year contract with Geylang International in February 2017, the striker scored three goals in pre-season for the Singaporean team, registering his first competitive goal for the Eagles in a 1–1 tie with Warriors FC in the S.League.

Persija Jakarta were rumored to have shown interest in buying him for the 2016 Indonesia Soccer Championship A.

References

External links
 
 
 Under Ladrón: Víctor Coto Ortega 

1990 births
Living people
People from Limón Province
Association football forwards
Costa Rican footballers
Gimnasia y Esgrima de Jujuy footballers
Costa Rican expatriate footballers
Costa Rican expatriate sportspeople in Malaysia
Expatriate footballers in Malta
Expatriate footballers in Argentina
Expatriate footballers in Malaysia
Expatriate footballers in Indonesia
Expatriate footballers in Myanmar
Expatriate footballers in Singapore
Singapore Premier League players
Geylang International FC players
Myanmar National League players